Křesetice is a municipality and village in Kutná Hora District in the Central Bohemian Region of the Czech Republic. It has about 700 inhabitants.

Administrative parts
Villages of Bykáň, Chrást and Krupá are administrative parts of Křesetice.

Notable people
Oldřich Lajsek (1925–2001), painter

References

Villages in Kutná Hora District